The Lagerhjelm family was a Swedish noble family, that rose to prominence with Johan Staffander (1628–1680). In 1668, the Lagerhjelm family was elevated to noble rank in the Kingdom of Sweden. It was associated with the Bofors Works in Karlskoga, where members of the family served as ironmasters.

Ironmaster Pehr Lagerhjelm acquired the Bofors Works in Karlskoga, his work there made him a pioneering industrialist.

In 1853, Lagerhjelm sold it to his sons Gustaf Reinhold and Per Erland Lagerhjelm. Per Erland Lagerhjelm procured more Lancashire hearths.

See also 

 List of Swedish noble families

Notes

References

Citations

Works cited

External links 

 Lagerhjelm family at adelsvapen.se

Swedish noble families